Park Avenue: Money, Power and the American Dream is a 2012 documentary film about the wealth gap in the United States directed by Alex Gibney.

Summary
The documentary compares the access to opportunities of residents of Park Avenue both on the Upper East Side and in the South Bronx. It draws upon Michael Gross's book 740 Park: The Story of the World's Richest Apartment Building, which showed that many billionaires live in that building. It goes on to explain that billionaire heir David Koch made significant donations to Paul Ryan in the same way that banker Steven Schwartzman lobbied Charles Schumer—for their own gain. The documentary includes interviews with a doorman at 740 Park Avenue, journalist Jane Mayer, Yale University Professor Jacob Hacker, University of California, Berkeley Professor Paul Piff, and Republican advisor Bruce Bartlett.

Critical reception
Reviewing it for The New York Times, Neil Genzlinger deplored the fact that the documentary equated great wealth with "callousness," adding that many wealthy people are very generous with their resources. In The Daily Telegraph, Neil Midgley compared it to Michael Moore's documentaries. He went on to suggest that it was "not entirely unconvincing," calling it "demagoguery." He concluded that it was "a poor contribution." Writing for The New York Observer, Kim Velsey suggested, "the documentary unfurls like a crime story." She concluded that the documentary "makes a compelling case that inequality imperils democracy and that the victims of the inequality include not only those who find themselves in the rapidly expanding underclass, but the American dream itself." The film was the subject of a WNET scheduling controversy in 2012.

References

External links

2012 films
Films directed by Alex Gibney
Documentary films about American politics
Documentary films about poverty in the United States
2010s English-language films
2010s American films